Wife or Country is a 1918 American silent drama film directed by E. Mason Hopper and starring Gloria Swanson in her last role for Triangle Film Corporation. It is not known whether the film currently survives.

Plot
Based upon a review in a film magazine, Gretchen (Lederer) has reclaimed husband Dale Barker (Mestayer) from a drinking habit, and he has become a lawyer working with the Department of Justice in hunting down German propagandists. Before their marriage, Gretchen had been involved with propagandists and cannot now extricate herself, and she fears discovery by her husband. She is jealous of Sylvia Hamilton (Swanson), Dale's stenographer, and plans on bringing her under suspicion. When arrested as a spy, Sylvia turns over a mass of evidence, some of which incriminates Gretchen, placing Dale between love of country and loyalty to his wife.

Cast
 Harry Mestayer as Dale Barker
 Gretchen Lederer as Gretchen Barker
 Gloria Swanson as Sylvia Hamilton
 Jack Richardson as Dr. Meyer Stahl
 Charles West as Jack Holiday

References

External links

1918 films
Silent American drama films
American black-and-white films
1918 drama films
Films directed by E. Mason Hopper
Triangle Film Corporation films
American silent feature films
1910s American films